Hogan "Kid" Bassey  MBE MON (3 June 1932 – 26 January 1998) was a Nigerian-British boxer; he was the first man of Nigerian descent to become a world boxing champion.

He was born Okon Asuquo Bassey on the banks of the Cross River, Creek Town, Calabar, Nigeria, and became naturalised British when he moved to the UK, where he spent most of his life in Liverpool. He took the name Kid Bassey when he turned professional as a boxer. He was managed by and trained by George Biddles and Jimmy August.

Boxing career
After 14 contests in Nigeria, Bassey went to Liverpool, England, arriving there three days before Christmas 1951.

After winning the Empire featherweight championship, he won the WBA world featherweight title by defeating French Algerian Cherif Hamia in Paris on the 24 June 1957. He lost the title to US fighter Davey Moore on 18 March 1959. Other opponents include Billy "Spider" Kelly, Percy Lewis, Tommy Profitt, Sammy McCarthy, Ricardo Moreno, and Willie Pep.

Life after boxing
In the 1958 New Year Honours, he was appointed a Member of the Order of the British Empire (MBE) "for services to sport in the Eastern Region, Nigeria". Bassey went on to become a coach in Nigeria, which awarded him the country's highest honour, the Order of the Niger, in 1973. He died on 26 January 1998 at his home in Apapa, Lagos.

Professional boxing record

|-
| style="text-align:center;" colspan="8"|59 Wins (21 knockouts, 38 decisions), 13 Losses (4 knockouts, 9 decisions), 2 Draws
|-  style="text-align:center; background:#e3e3e3;"
|  style="border-style:none none solid solid; "|Result
|  style="border-style:none none solid solid; "|Record
|  style="border-style:none none solid solid; "|Opponent
|  style="border-style:none none solid solid; "|Type
|  style="border-style:none none solid solid; "|Round
|  style="border-style:none none solid solid; "|Date
|  style="border-style:none none solid solid; "|Location
|  style="border-style:none none solid solid; "|Notes
|- align=center
|Loss
|68–13–4
|align=left| Davey Moore
|RTD
|11 (15)
|19 August 1959
|align=left| Los Angeles, United States
|align=left|
|-
|Loss
|68–12–4
|align=left| Davey Moore
|RTD
|13 (15)
|18 March 1959
|align=left| Los Angeles, United States
|align=left|
|-
|Win
|68–11–4
|align=left| Ernesto Parra
|UD
|10
|13 December 1958
|align=left| Hollywood, United States
|
|-
|Win
|67–11–4
|align=left| Carmelo Costa
|UD
|10
|31 October 1958
|align=left| New York City, United States
|
|-
|Win
|66–11–4
|align=left| Willie Pep
|TKO
|9
|20 September 1958
|align=left| Boston, Massachusetts, United States
|
|-
|Win
|65–11–4
|align=left| Jules Touan
|TKO
|7
|24 June 1958
|align=left| Kensington, London, United Kingdom
|align=left|
|-
|Win
|64–11–4
|align=left| Ricardo Moreno
|KO
|3 (15)
|1 April 1958
|align=left| Los Angeles, United States
|align=left|
|-
|Win
|63–11–4
|align=left| Jean Pierre Cossemyns
|PTS
|10
|23 January 1958
|align=left| Liverpool, Merseyside, United Kingdom
|align=left|
|-
|Win
|62–11–4
|align=left| Victor Pepeder
|PTS
|10
|7 October 1957
|align=left| Nottingham, Nottinghamshire, United Kingdom
|align=left|
|-
|Win
|61–11–4
|align=left| Cherif Hamia
|TKO
|10 (15)
|24 June 1957
|align=left| Paris, France
|align=left|
|-
|Win
|60–11–4
|align=left| Miguel Berrios
|UD
|12
|26 April 1957
|align=left| Washington, District of Columbia, United States
|align=left|
|-
|Win
|59–11–4
|align=left| Percy Lewis
|PTS
|15
|1 April 1957
|align=left| Nottingham, Nottinghamshire, United Kingdom
|align=left|
|-
|Win
|58–11–4
|align=left| Joao Dos Santos
|PTS
|10
|26 November 1956
|align=left| Leicester, East Midlands, United Kingdom
|align=left|
|-
|Loss
|57–11–4
|align=left| Jean Sneyers
|TKO
|4
|26 November 1956
|align=left| Liège, Belgium
|align=left|
|-
|Win
|57–10–4
|align=left| Alby Tissong
|PTS
|8
|6 September 1956
|align=left| Liverpool, Merseyside, United Kingdom
|align=left|
|-
|Win
|56–10–4
|align=left| Aldo Pravisani
|PTS
|8
|3 May 1956
|align=left| Liverpool, Merseyside, United Kingdom
|align=left|
|-
|Win
|55–10–4
|align=left| Louis Cabo
|TKO
|4
|22 March 1956
|align=left| Liverpool, Merseyside, United Kingdom
|
|-
|Win
|54–10–4
|align=left| Jean Sneyers
|TKO
|4
|7 February 1956
|align=left| Harringay, London, United Kingdom
|
|-
|Win
|53–10–4
|align=left| Billy Kelly
|KO
|8
|19 November 1955
|align=left| Belfast, Northern Ireland, United Kingdom
|align=left|
|-
|Win
|52–10–4
|align=left| Joe Quinn
|KO
|1
|8 October 1955
|align=left| Belfast, Northern Ireland, United Kingdom
|align=left|
|-
|Win
|51–10–4
|align=left| Juan Oscar Alvarez
|PTS
|10
|25 August 1955
|align=left| Liverpool, Merseyside, United Kingdom
|align=left|
|-
|Win
|50–10–4
|align=left| Andre Pierson
|PTS
|10
|3 June 1955
|align=left| Manchester, United Kingdom
|align=left|
|-
|Win
|49–10–4
|align=left| Marcel Ranvial
|KO
|5
|22 March 1955
|align=left| Kensington, London, United Kingdom
|align=left|
|-
|Win
|48–10–4
|align=left| Percy Lewis
|PTS
|8
|31 January 1955
|align=left| Nottingham, Nottinghamshire, United Kingdom
|align=left|
|-
|Win
|47–10–4
|align=left| Aime Devisch
|PTS
|10
|29 November 1954
|align=left| Leeds, Yorkshire, United Kingdom
|align=left|
|-
|Win
|46–10–4
|align=left| Harry Ramsden
|PTS
|8
|27 October 1954
|align=left| Blackpool, Lancashire, United Kingdom
|align=left|
|-
|Win
|45–10–4
|align=left| Luis Romero
|PTS
|10
|3 September 1954
|align=left| Manchester, United Kingdom
|align=left|
|-
|Loss
|44–10–4
|align=left| Jo Woussem
|PTS
|8
|12 August 1954
|align=left| Liverpool, Merseyside, United Kingdom
|align=left|
|-
|Win
|44–9–4
|align=left| Jacques Legendre
|PTS
|10
|2 July 1954
|align=left| Manchester, United Kingdom
|align=left|
|-
|Win
|43–9–4
|align=left| Enrico Macale
|PTS
|8
|3 June 1954
|align=left| Liverpool, Merseyside, United Kingdom
|align=left|
|-
|Win
|42–9–4
|align=left| Jean Sneyers
|PTS
|10
|29 April 1954
|align=left| Liverpool, Merseyside, United Kingdom
|align=left|
|-
|Win
|41–9–4
|align=left| Johnny Butterworth
|PTS
|10
|4 March 1954
|align=left| Liverpool, Merseyside, United Kingdom
|align=left|
|-
|Loss
|40–9–4
|align=left| Billy Kelly
|PTS
|8
|8 December 1953
|align=left| Harringay, London, United Kingdom
|align=left|
|-
|Win
|40–8–4
|align=left| Sammy McCarthy
|PTS
|10
|6 October 1953
|align=left| Kensington, London, United Kingdom
|align=left|
|-
|Loss
|39–8–4
|align=left| Juan Oscar Alvarez
|PTS
|10
|7 September 1953
|align=left| Newcastle, Tyne and Wear, United Kingdom
|align=left|
|-
|Win
|39–7–4
|align=left| Tommy Higgins
|PTS
|8
|27 August 1953
|align=left| Liverpool, Merseyside, United Kingdom
|align=left|
|-
|Win
|38–7–4
|align=left| Denny Dawson
|KO
|4
|9 July 1953
|align=left| Liverpool, Merseyside, United Kingdom
|align=left|
|-
|Loss
|37–7–4
|align=left| Emile Chemama
|TKO
|5
|24 March 1953
|align=left| Kensington, London, United Kingdom
|align=left|
|-
|Win
|37–6–4
|align=left| Luis Romero
|TKO
|8
|27 February 1953
|align=left| Manchester, United Kingdom
|align=left|
|-
|Loss
|36–6–4
|align=left| Johnny Haywood
|DQ
|3
|30 January 1953
|align=left| Blackpool, Lancashire, United Kingdom
|align=left|
|-
|Win
|36–5–4
|align=left| Ken Lawrence
|TKO
|5
|20 January 1953
|align=left| Kensington, London, United Kingdom
|align=left|
|-
|Win
|35–5–4
|align=left| Jackie Briers
|PTS
|10
|8 January 1953
|align=left| Liverpool, Merseyside, United Kingdom
|align=left|
|-
|Win
|34–5–4
|align=left| Bobby Boland
|TKO
|5
|15 December 1952
|align=left| Manchester, United Kingdom
|align=left|
|-
|Loss
|33–5–4
|align=left| Jean Pierre Cossemyns
|PTS
|10
|8 December 1952
|align=left| Leeds, Yorkshire, United Kingdom
|align=left|
|-
|Win
|33–4–4
|align=left| Tommy Proffitt
|TKO
|7
|14 November 1952
|align=left| Manchester, United Kingdom
|align=left|
|-
|Win
|32–4–4
|align=left| Tommy Proffitt
|PTS
|8
|27 October 1952
|align=left| Manchester, United Kingdom
|align=left|
|-
|Win
|31–4–4
|align=left| Eddie Carson
|PTS
|8
|9 October 1952
|align=left| Liverpool, Merseyside, United Kingdom
|align=left|
|-
|Win
|30–4–4
|align=left| Eddie McCormick
|PTS
|8
|22 September 1952
|align=left| Manchester, United Kingdom
|align=left|
|-
|Win
|29–4–4
|align=left| Stan Skinless
|TKO
|7
|11 September 1952
|align=left| Liverpool, Merseyside, United Kingdom
|align=left|
|-
|Win
|28–4–4
|align=left| Tommy Higgins
|PTS
|8
|28 August 1952
|align=left| Liverpool, Merseyside, United Kingdom
|align=left|
|-
|Win
|27–4–4
|align=left| Jimmy Cardew
|PTS
|8
|7 August 1952
|align=left| Liverpool, Merseyside, United Kingdom
|align=left|
|-
|Win
|26–4–4
|align=left| Johnny Barclay
|KO
|6
|28 July 1952
|align=left| West Hartlepool, County Durham, United Kingdom
|align=left|
|-
|Win
|25–4–4
|align=left| Ivor Davies
|KO
|2
|23 June 1952
|align=left| West Hartlepool, County Durham, United Kingdom
|align=left|
|-
|Loss
|24–4–4
|align=left| Frankie Williams
|PTS
|8
|15 May 1952
|align=left| Liverpool, Merseyside, United Kingdom
|align=left|
|-
|Loss
|24–3–4
|align=left| John Kelly
|PTS
|8
|26 April 1952
|align=left| Belfast, Northern Ireland, United Kingdom
|align=left|
|-
|Win
|24–2–4
|align=left| Bobby Boland
|KO
|5
|17 April 1952
|align=left| Liverpool, Merseyside, United Kingdom
|align=left|
|-
|Draw
|23–2–4
|align=left| Glyn Evans
|PTS
|8
|1 April 1952
|align=left| Hanley, Staffordshire, United Kingdom
|align=left|
|-
|Win
|23–2–3
|align=left| Len Shaw
|PTS
|8
|24 March 1952
|align=left| Preston, Lancashire, United Kingdom
|align=left|
|-
|Win
|22–2–3
|align=left| Tommy Higgins
|PTS
|8
|5 March 1952
|align=left| Blackpool, Lancashire, United Kingdom
|align=left|
|-
|Win
|21–2–3
|align=left| Peter Fay
|PTS
|8
|19 February 1952
|align=left| Hanley, Staffordshire, United Kingdom
|align=left|
|-
|Win
|20–2–3
|align=left| Ray Hillyard
|TKO
|4
|31 January 1952
|align=left| Liverpool, Merseyside, United Kingdom
|align=left|
|-
|Win
|19–2–3
|align=left| Young Spider Neequaye
|PTS
|12
|28 September 1951
|align=left| Lagos, Nigeria
|align=left|
|-
|Win
|18–2–3
|align=left| Steve Jeffra
|PTS
|12
|29 August 1951
|align=left| Lagos, Nigeria
|align=left|
|-
|Draw
|17–2–3
|align=left| Little Joe
|PTS
|10
|Jul 08, 1951
|align=left| Emmy Cinema Theatre, Aba
|align=left|
|-
|Win
|17–2–2
|align=left| Adjetey Sowah
|PTS
|10
|30 May 1951
|align=left| Lagos, Nigeria
|align=left|
|-
|Win
|16–2–2
|align=left| Jack Salami
|PTS
|8
|16 May 1951
|align=left| Lagos, Nigeria
|align=left|
|-
|Win
|15–2–2
|align=left|Kid Chukudi
|TKO
|3
|4 May 1951
|align=left| Lagos, Nigeria
|align=left|
|-
|Win
|14–2–2
|align=left| Dick Turpin
|PTS
|6
|29 January 1951
|align=left| Lagos, Nigeria
|align=left|
|-
|Win
|13–2–2
|align=left| Joe Bennett
|TKO
|10 (12)
|Nov 10, 1950
|align=left| Lagos, Nigeria
|align=left|
|-
|Win
|12–2–2
|align=left| Eddie Phillips
|PTS
|6
|Oct 06, 1950
|align=left| Lagos, Nigeria
|align=left|
|-
|Win
|11–2–2
|align=left| Steve Jeffra
|PTS
|12
|7 July 1950
|align=left| Lagos, Nigeria
|align=left|
|-
|Draw
|10–2–2
|align=left| Ogli Tettey
|PTS
|12
|31 May 1950
|align=left| Lagos, Nigeria
|align=left|
|-
|Loss
|10–2–1
|align=left| Bola Lawal
|TKO
|5 (6)
|Mar 01, 1950
|align=left| Glover Memorial Hall, Lagos
|
|-
|Win
|10–1–1
|align=left| Bob Emmanuel
|TKO
|4 (12)
|Dec 26, 1949
|align=left| Railway Stadium, Lagos 
|align=left|
|-
|Loss
|9–1–1
|align=left| Dick Turpin
|DQ
|5 (12)
|Nov 28, 1949
|align=left| Lagos, Nigeria
|align=left|
|-
|Win
|9–0–1
|align=left| Texas Kid
|PTS
|10
|26 October 1949
|align=left| Glover Memorial Hall, Lagos
|align=left|
|-
|Win
|8–0–1
|align=left| Dick Turpin
|PTS
|12
|27 July 1949
|align=left| Lagos, Nigeria
|align=left|
|-
|Win
|7–0–1
|align=left| Jack Sala
|TKO
|4 (6))
|27 Jul 1949
|align=left| Royal Hotel, Lagos 
|
|-
|Win
|6–0–1
|align=left| Ogli Tettey
|PTS
|12
|28 Mar 1949
|align=left| Glover Memorial Hall, Lagos  
|
|-
|Win
|5–0–1
|align=left| Jack Sala
|TKO
|4 (6)
|31 January 1949
|align=left| African Tennis Club, Lagos  
|
|-
|Win
|4–0–1
|align=left| Hurry Kid
|KO
|4 (6)
|30 December 1948
|align=left| Lagos  
|
|-
|Win
|3–0–1
|align=left| Hurry Kid
|PTS
|6
|29 November 1948
|align=left| Lagos  
|
|-
|Draw
|2–0–1
|align=left| Bolo Lawal
|PTS
|6
|26 May 1948
|align=left| Glover Memorial Hall, Lagos  
|
|-
|Win
|2–0
|align=left| Jack Sala
|PTS
|6
|6 February 1948
|align=left| Lagos  
|
|-
|Win
|1–0
|align=left| Jimmy Brown
|PTS
|6
|28 November 1947
|align=left| African Tennis Club, Lagos 
|
|}

See also
Lineal championship

External links
 
https://boxrec.com/media/index.php/National_Boxing_Association%27s_Quarterly_Ratings:_1957
https://boxrec.com/media/index.php/National_Boxing_Association%27s_Quarterly_Ratings:_1958
https://boxrec.com/media/index.php/National_Boxing_Association%27s_Quarterly_Ratings:_1959

References

1932 births
1998 deaths
People from Cross River State
Nigerian male boxers
British male boxers
Naturalised citizens of the United Kingdom
People of Efik descent
Featherweight boxers
World featherweight boxing champions
Members of the Order of the British Empire
Members of the Order of the Niger
Nigerian emigrants to the United Kingdom